Ilandaikulam is a village in Madurai district, India. It is also very close to the ring road. The Tamil Nadu government has plans to open the IT park very soon here.

References

Villages in Madurai district